Florentino Galang Lavarias is a Filipino bishop of the Catholic church. He is the fourth and current archbishop of San Fernando. He succeeded Paciano Aniceto as the Archbishop of San Fernando. He had previously served as the fourth Bishop of Iba.

Biography
Lavarias was born on March 14, 1957, in Santa Ines, Mabalacat. He graduated in college at the Holy Angel University in 1978 before entering the San Carlos Seminary. He was ordained a priest on September 26, 1985, at the Our Lady of Grace Parish. He served various parishes under the Archdiocese of San Fernando. He was appointed Bishop of the Roman Catholic Diocese of Iba. He was consecrated on August 12, 2004, at the Metropolitan Cathedral of San Fernando. His consecrator was then the Apostolic Nuncio to the Philippines, Antonio Franco while his co-consecrators are Paciano Aniceto and Gaudencio Rosales .

On July 25, 2014, Pope Francis named him as Archbishop of San Fernando (De Pampanga), succeeding Aniceto, who resigned on reaching the age limit.

References

21st-century Roman Catholic archbishops in the Philippines
Living people
Kapampangan people
People from Mabalacat
1957 births
Roman Catholic archbishops of San Fernando